Outlaws Like Me is the second studio album by American country music artist Justin Moore. It was released on June 21, 2011 via The Valory Music Co. The album's first single, "If Heaven Wasn't So Far Away", became Moore's second number one hit on the US Billboard Hot Country Songs chart. Its single, "Bait a Hook" reached the top 20 at number 17. The third single, "Til My Last Day", peaked at number one on the Country Airplay chart. Moore co-wrote eleven of the thirteen songs on the album.

Promotion
On February 2, 2013, Moore announced his first headline tour, with Dustin Lynch and Jon Pardi as supporting acts, starting on March 14 in Pikeville's Eastern Kentucky Expo Center and ending on April 20 at The Corbin Arena.

Reception

Commercial
Outlaws Like Me debuted at number five on the Billboard 200, and number one on the Top Country Albums chart after selling 65,000 copies during its first week of release. As of September 2013, the album has sold 577,000 copies in the United States.

Critical

Giving it three stars out of five, AllMusic's Stephen Thomas Erlewine thought that the album was an improvement over Moore's debut. He thought that the sound was "a leaner country rock" and said that it "packs a punch that carries through on the promise of Moore's braggadocio". Dan MacIntosh of Roughstock gave the album one star out of five, referring to the album's lead single, "If Heaven Wasn't So Far Away," as "an exception to an otherwise classless effort." He found the record pandering and relying heavily on country stereotypes. In 2017, Billboard contributor Chuck Dauphin placed three tracks from the album on his top 10 list of Moore's best songs: "If Heaven Wasn't So Far Away" at number one, "Bait a Hook" at number four and "Til My Last Day" at number six.

Track listing

Personnel
 Jim "Moose" Brown - keyboards
 Perry Coleman - background vocals
 Larry Franklin - fiddle
 Tommy Harden - drums
 Mike Johnson - steel guitar
 Doug Kahan - bass guitar
 Troy Lancaster - electric guitar
 Justin Moore - lead vocals 
 Russ Pahl - steel guitar
 Mike Rojas - keyboards
 Curt Ryle - acoustic guitar
 Jason Kyle Saetveit - background vocals
 Steve Sheehan - acoustic guitar
 Russell Terrell - background vocals

Chart performance

Weekly charts

Year-end charts

Singles

Certifications

References

2011 albums
Justin Moore albums
Big Machine Records albums
Albums produced by Jeremy Stover